The American Institute for Cancer Research (AICR) is a large American cancer research organization associated with the World Cancer Research Fund umbrella organization.

As of 2018, the charity has a "one star" rating from Charity Navigator, with a score of 62.81 out of 100. At the time of their rating, over 45% of the charity's income turned around into fundraising expenses. For the fiscal year ending September 2018, the organization had annual revenues of $15.5 million.

One of AICR's major initiatives is the Continuous Update Project (CUP), which is a comprehensive review of all the available scientific literature on the links between diet, physical activity, weight, and cancer risk.

Its research focus areas include the links between diet and cancer risk, the effects of physical activity on cancer prevention and treatment, and the development of new cancer therapies.

References

External links
 

Non-profit organizations based in Washington, D.C.
Cancer organizations based in the United States
Medical and health organizations based in Washington, D.C.
Cancer charities in the United States